Emil Hübscher (3 September 1912 – 25 February 1958) was an Austrian middle-distance runner. He competed in the men's 800 metres at the 1936 Summer Olympics.

References

External links
 

1912 births
1958 deaths
Athletes (track and field) at the 1936 Summer Olympics
Austrian male middle-distance runners
Olympic athletes of Austria